Federico Barrionuevo (born June 30, 1981) is an Argentine footballer who played for clubs in Ecuador and Colombia as well as spending the majority of his career in domestic football.

References
 Profile at BDFA 
 

1981 births
Living people
Argentine footballers
Argentine expatriate footballers
Club Atlético Platense footballers
Defensa y Justicia footballers
Deportivo Español footballers
Tiro Federal footballers
Club Atlético Banfield footballers
Olimpo footballers
Club Atlético Lanús footballers
Club Atlético Tigre footballers
All Boys footballers
Atlético Tucumán footballers
Cúcuta Deportivo footballers
C.D. Cuenca footballers
CSyD Tristán Suárez footballers
Club Comunicaciones footballers
Argentine Primera División players
Primera B Metropolitana players
Ecuadorian Serie A players
Categoría Primera A players
Expatriate footballers in Ecuador
Expatriate footballers in Colombia
Association football midfielders
Sportspeople from Lanús